Burbank School District 111 is an elementary school district located in Burbank, Illinois, a southwest Chicago suburb just south of Chicago Midway International Airport in Stickney Township, Cook County. The district, which was established in 1923 – nearly a half century before the city incorporated in 1970 – includes seven elementary schools and one junior high school, all of which are located within the city of Burbank; all of the elementary schools enroll students from kindergarten through sixth grade. The district superintendent is Carol Kunst.

Schools

Elementary schools
The elementary schools are:
Luther Burbank School (1943), under principal Robert Mocek, which was reopened in 2018 after being rebuilt
Richard E. Byrd School (1958), principal Marian Stockhausen
Harry E. Fry School (1956), principal Mary Rein, which closed after the 2003–2004 school year and reopened during the 2009–2010 school year.
Jacqueline Kennedy School (1964), principal J.R. Entsminger
Rosa G. Maddock School (1954), principal Mark Antkiewicz
Frances B. McCord School, principal Patricia Donaghue
Edward J. Tobin School (1938), principal Mary Anne Sheehan, which was reopened in 2007 after being rebuilt

Students from all these elementary schools move on to Liberty Junior High School, which is under the direction of principal Jim Martin. Prior to Liberty's opening in 2004, most of the elementary schools enrolled students through eighth grade. Following junior high school, students advance to Reavis High School.

Middle schools
Liberty Junior High School

Former schools
Former schools in the district included:
John Foster Dulles School (1960-?), which was demolished to make way for Liberty Junior High School
Nottingham Park School (1950-?), in the adjacent unincorporated community of the same name
Marjorie Owens School (1956-1980), which was converted into a police station and courthouse, and later into the township's senior citizens' center

References

External links
 
 A brief history of school district 111

School districts in Cook County, Illinois
Burbank, Illinois
School districts established in 1923
1923 establishments in Illinois